Oedicarena latifrons is a species of tephritid or fruit flies in the genus Oedicarena of the family Tephritidae.

References

Trypetinae